Barrie—Innisfil is a provincial electoral district in Ontario, Canada. It elects one member to the Legislative Assembly of Ontario. The riding was created in 2015 from portions of Barrie and York—Simcoe ridings, and it is congruent with the new federal riding of the same name.

Members of Provincial Parliament

Election results

References

External links 
2018 Riding map from Elections Ontario

Ontario provincial electoral districts
Politics of Barrie